Mary, Mother of Grace is a Roman Catholic prayer to the Blessed Virgin Mary.

Background and origin
This prayer is a fragment from within the DEVOTION IN MEMORY OF THE AGONY OF JESUS found in Section VI of the Raccolta.

Hymn
Maria, mater gratiae,
Mary, gracious mother,
Dulcis parens clementiae,
Sweet fount of mercy,
Tu nos ab hoste protege,
Protect us from the foe,
Et mortis hora suscipe.
And receive us in our hour of death.
Jesu, tibi sit gloria,
Jesu, glory be to Thee,
Qui natus es de Virgine,
Born of the Virgin,
Cum Patre et almo Spiritu,
With the Father and the Holy Spirit,
In sempiterna saecula. Amen.
For ever and ever. Amen.

See also

Roman Catholic Mariology
Raccolta
Marian devotions
Blessed Virgin Mary

References

Christian prayer
Roman Catholic prayers
Marian devotions